Laura Phelps Rogers is a sculptor who works with bronze, iron, and other metal fabrication techniques, as well as photography and site-specific installations.

Born in Denver, Colorado, Phelps Rogers sees her work as an "extension of the Western landscape." She has been part of the Pirate and Ice Cube Co-Ops in Denver, and in 2018 opened FoolPRoof Gallery in the River North Arts District. Phelps Rogers has a connection to antiques, which she says:

Her work is held by the Denver Art Museum, the Anschutz Medical Campus, Lamar Station Crossing and the Talsi Regional Museum in Latvia.

References

Living people
Year of birth missing (living people)
American women sculptors
Artists from Denver
Sculptors from Colorado
21st-century American women